Ken Jacob (born January 23, 1949) is an American Democratic politician who served in the Missouri Senate and the Missouri House of Representatives from 1983 until 2004.

Born in St. Louis, Missouri, Jacob graduated from the University of Missouri with a bachelor of science degree in education.  He also has master's degrees in education, counseling, and public administration and a J.D. degree also from the University of Missouri.  He previously worked as an executive director of an adolescent treatment center in Columbia, Missouri.

Jacob resigned from the Missouri Senate to take a seat to the state Labor and Industrial Relations Commission under Governor Bob Holden.  In 2013, Governor Jay Nixon appointed Jacob acting director of the Missouri's Division of Employment Security.  Jacob made an unsuccessful bid for lieutenant governor in 2004 and an unsuccessful bid for Congress in 2008.

Electoral History

State Representative

State Senate

Lieutenant Governor

United States Representative

References

1949 births
20th-century American politicians
Democratic Party members of the Missouri House of Representatives
Democratic Party Missouri state senators
University of Missouri alumni
Living people